Major Donald E. Vandergriff, United States Army (Ret.), is a teacher, writer and lecturer who specializes in military leadership education and training.

Background
Vandergriff served with the United States Marine Corps and United States Army. He retired after 24 years of service. He holds a bachelor's degree in education from the University of Tennessee and a master's degree in military history from American Military University.  He was the first major from the Army to lecture at the Naval War College.

Influence
Lecturer, author and expert on military personnel issues, Dr. Jonathan Shay, refers to Vandergriff as “the most influential major in the U.S. Army”. Journalist James Fallows of The Atlantic Monthly has sought out Vandergriff for consultation of several of his articles, mentioning him in his piece “Will Iran be Next”, (December 2004).

Bibliography
  – editor
 
  
 
 Chapter: 
 The Revolution in Human Affairs

References
AUSA - https://www.ausa.org/people/donald-e-vandergriff

Amazon - https://www.amazon.com/Don-Vandergriff/e/B0092WE7HY%3Fref=dbs_a_mng_rwt_scns_share

USNI - https://www.usni.org/people/donald-vandergriff

WASHINGTON POST - http://views.washingtonpost.com/leadership/panelists/2010/12/ron-paul.html

External links
 
 The Atlantic Monthly

Living people
University of Tennessee alumni
United States Army officers
Year of birth missing (living people)